Comb Sister is a kind of Chinese traditional women culture, which refers to a culture that some women set up their hairstyle like married women with determination to stay single all their life. Those women are called the Net Female after they die.

In the past, unmarried women who were from the Pearl River delta like Guangzhou, Heyuan cities had hairstyle of long braids. And when they got married, their mother would help them to rolled their braids into a ball because that was married women's hairstyle. However, Comb female would change their hairstyle into a bun on their own to show their determination that they would never get married until they died.

Origin of Comb Sister 

The origin of the Comb Sister was the result of rigid feudal system in ancient China.  At that time, many women could not stand being abused by their husbands, therefore, they refused to get married and decided to stay with partners to support each other until they died. The custom of the Comb Sister had kept more than 300 years under the oppression of the feudal system, and it was up to world in mid and late Ming dynasty since the rise of the silk industry in Shunde provided women with work opportunities. Women gradually gained the financial ability to feed themselves through mulberry planting, silkworm rearing, and silk reeling. In the 1930s, along with improvement of women's social status and the impact of war, Comb Sisters gradually faded away.

History of Comb Sister 

In the very beginning, being a comb sister had its special ceremony. Firstly, some villagers with high reputation would represent the whole village to choose the "Lucky Day and Lucky Time"(great privilege) to hold the ceremony. And as the lucky time comes, several elder women would host the "Comb" ceremony, there the women who wanted to become comb sisters would change their hairstyle with a promise that they would never get married. And in the same day, the whole village would set tables to announce the decision to their friends and the public.

Until the 1930s, with the decline of silk industry in the Pearl River Delta, young women heard that they could get the higher income if they worked in Southeast Asia, so they called their friends to go there for earning a living. In order to earn more money, many women who have worked in Southeast Asia for many years have never talked about the marriage.

Ever since The revolution of 1911 and the establishment of the Republic of China, the feudal system and customs broke down, and the custom of comb sister declined. In the early years of the Republic of China, the whole of China's silk industry collapsed, which meant that the comb females cannot earn their livings, therefore, some of them chose to go to Hong Kong as house maids. Today's Hong Kong Tsat Tsz Mui Road also originated from those comb sister.

Customs of Comb Sister- The Custom of Grave Keeping 

Once women determined to change their hairstyle to become comb sisters, they had no choice to turn back. What was more,  if they broke their promise, they would be tortured by their villagers such as being loaded in to a pig cage and being drowned in the river. However, even when they died, it was still not unacceptable for their parents to bury them.

According to the old custom, comb sisters were not allowed to die in their home or other relatives' homes. They could only be buried outside of their village. Worse still, only other comb sisters could visit the grave, hence, some of them become their friends' grave keepers, and that was the custom we call "Grave Keeping ".

Museum of Comb Sister 

Bingyu Museum, located in Jun'an, Shunde. It is a two-story building with left, middle and right three underground blocks. In a middle block people set a statue of Avalokitesvara  and in the left and right blocks there are some tablets of dead comb sisters . Besides, the second floor is the room where comb sisters live. The whole building takes about five hundred square meters and covers an area of nearly two acres. Bingyu Museum was officially opened to the public on 25 December 2012.

See also 
Chinese culture
Culture of Hong Kong
Lingnan

References 

Chinese architectural history
Architecture in China
Chinese culture